Cam Farrar is an Australian DJ and producer who also goes by the name Kikumoto Allstars. He released his debut single "Wasted" in 2003, which peaked at number 46 on the ARIA Charts and reached number 1 on ARIA's dance charts. "Wasted" was nominated for the Best Dance Release and the 2004 ARIA Awards.

Discography

Singles

Awards

ARIA Music Awards
The ARIA Music Awards is an annual awards ceremony that recognises excellence, innovation, and achievement across all genres of Australian music. They commenced in 1987. Cam Farrar was nominated for one award.

|-
| 2004
| "Wasted"
| ARIA Award for Best Dance Release
| 
|-

References

Living people
Year of birth missing (living people)